West Virginia Northern Community College (WVNCC) is a public community college with its main campus in downtown Wheeling, West Virginia. Established in 1972, WVNCC serves all six counties in West Virginia's Northern Panhandle. It is part of the West Virginia Community and Technical College System.

The main campus is housed in the former Baltimore & Ohio Railroad Terminal at Wheeling. It also has branch campuses in Weirton, West Virginia and in New Martinsville, West Virginia.

References

External links 

Education in Hancock County, West Virginia
Education in Ohio County, West Virginia
Education in Wetzel County, West Virginia
Educational institutions established in 1972
West Virginia Community and Technical College System
1972 establishments in West Virginia